Orange-billed tern is a name applied to a group of three large terns in the genus Thalasseus with orange bills, which are quite similar in appearance and often considered difficult to identify, namely:

 Royal tern, Thalasseus maximus
 Lesser crested tern, Thalasseus bengalensis
 Elegant tern, Thalasseus elegans

The greater crested tern (Thalasseus bergii) and the Cayenne tern (Thalasseus sandvicensis eurygnatha), which have yellow rather than orange bills, are sometimes also considered part of this group.

Identification
Identification of orange-billed terns within their range is straightforward. Crested and Cayenne terns (which do not overlap in range) can be identified by their bill colour. Of the truly orange-billed species, the only geographical overlaps are between royal and lesser crested, and between royal and elegant Terns, and in both cases the larger size and strong bill of royal tern should prevent misidentifications (in addition, lesser crested terns have a grey, not white, rump).

Identification of vagrants has proved to be much more difficult however, with known hybridisation, and birds which do not match the classic character sets of individual species. See the references list below for more information.

References
 Gantlett, Steve (2003): Identification of orange-billed terns. Birding World 16(7): 285-304.
This article presents 51 captioned photographs of elegant, lesser crested and Cayenne terns, with an emphasis on "non-classic" individuals.
 Millington, Richard (2002): The orange-billed terns in summer 2002. Birding World 15(7): 287-290.
This article documents the 2002 influx into Britain, with discussion about the identification characters shown by each of the four or five birds, all of which are illustrated by photographs.
 Millington, Richard & Gantlett, Steve (2002): The orange-billed tern in Norfolk. Birding World 15(6): 244-246.
This article documents a bird seen in Norfolk, England in summer 2002 which resembled both elegant and lesser crested terns to some degree; the article is accompanied by photos of this bird and a presumed elegant tern seen in a Florida tern colony in 2002.

Thalasseus